Stary Broniszew  is a village in the administrative district of Gmina Mykanów, within Częstochowa County, Silesian Voivodeship, in southern Poland.

The village has a population of 717.

Notable people

 Krzysztof Smela, politician

References

Stary Broniszew